Matthew John Clarke (born 3 November 1973 in Sheffield) is an English former football goalkeeper.

Club career
Clarke's first club was Rotherham United, where his nickname was Matt the Cat, in reference to his agility. He won the 1996 Football League Trophy with Rotherham. He then signed with Sheffield Wednesday where he served as cover to Kevin Pressman.

He joined Bradford City after they won promotion to the Premier League in 1999 and  helped Bolton Wanderers two years later into the Premier League, playing in the play-off final. His impressive displays for Bradford City led to many, including the Bradford supporters, calling for him to receive international selection.

In the summer of 2001 Clarke signed for newly promoted Premier League side Fulham on a one-month loan, which effectively acted as a trial. However, he returned to Bradford after just one week.

He later joined Crystal Palace but his career was curtailed by an injury he suffered which caused his premature retirement in 2004.

References

External links
Profile Boy from Brazil

1973 births
Living people
English footballers
Rotherham United F.C. players
Sheffield Wednesday F.C. players
Kidderminster Harriers F.C. players
Bradford City A.F.C. players
Bolton Wanderers F.C. players
Crystal Palace F.C. players
Premier League players
English Football League players
Association football goalkeepers
Fulham F.C. players